Serguei Anatoliyovich Sednev (born December 12, 1983 in Hlukhiv) is a retired Ukrainian biathlete.

Career
He debuted for Ukraine at the World Cup on January 17, 2004, in Ruhpolding. In sprint he was the 67th. First World Cup podium was three years later - in December, 2007, he was third in individual race in Pokljuka. First World Cup win was in Antholz-Anterselva in individual on 21 January 2010. He is a bronze medalists of 2011 Biathlon World Championships in relay in which he was a "finisher". He had been a captain of men's national team for some years before he retired.

He unexpectedly retired on December 19, 2014, on his 31st birthday. In an interview for biathlon.com.ua he stated, that the first reason is absence of good results, and he had often been ill before the season. "At one moment I understood that I can't find any motivation to go on. Maybe, it is time to pay more attention to my family... that I couldn't afford this for a long years of my career".

Doping ban
By IBU press release dated January 12, 2015, it was announced that Sednev had tested positive for recombinant EPO upon re-analysis of an out of competition sample originally taken on January 22, 2013. Sednev waved his is right for B-analysis and was subsequently banned for two years starting December 15, 2014. 
This effectively puts the start of his ban four days prior to his sudden retirement announcement.

Performances

World Cup

Podiums

Positions

References

External links
 Profile on biathlonworld.com
 Statistics
 Profile on biathlonworld.com.ua

1983 births
Living people
People from Hlukhiv
Ukrainian male biathletes
Biathletes at the 2010 Winter Olympics
Biathletes at the 2014 Winter Olympics
Olympic biathletes of Ukraine
Biathlon World Championships medalists
Ukrainian sportspeople in doping cases
Doping cases in biathlon
Universiade medalists in biathlon
Universiade silver medalists for Ukraine
Competitors at the 2007 Winter Universiade
Hlukhiv National Pedagogical University of Oleksandr Dovzhenko alumni
Sportspeople from Sumy Oblast